25th Anniversary may refer to:

Silver wedding anniversary
The Phantom of the Opera at the Royal Albert Hall

Albums
25th Anniversary, by Diana Ross and The Supremes, 1986
25th Anniversary, by The Temptations,  1986
25th Anniversary (Wolfe Tones album), 1989
25th Anniversary, by Magnolia Jazz Band, 1998
25th Anniversary, by Bagatelle (band), 2004
25th Anniversary,  by Pasadena Roof Orchestra, 2008
25th Anniversary, by The Nerves, 2001
25th Anniversary Album (Shirley Bassey album), 1978
The 25th Anniversary Album (Lee Kernaghan album), 2017
25th Anniversary Collection, by K.C. & The Sunshine Band, 1999
The ★ Collection: 25th Anniversary Edition, by The Monkees, 1992
The Twenty-fifth Anniversary Anthology, by The Fixx, 2006 
Unarmed – Best of 25th Anniversary, by Helloween, 2009
Interpretations: A 25th Anniversary Celebration, by The Carpenters, 1995
25th Anniversary Ultimate Best -The One-, by Luna Sea, 2014